Jovestan (also Romanized as Jovestān, Joīstān, Jowestān, and Jowstān) is a village in Bala Taleqan Rural District, in the Central District of Taleqan County, Alborz Province, Iran. At the 2006 census, its population was 421, in 125 families.

References 

Populated places in Taleqan County